The Sparidae are a family of fish in the order Perciformes, commonly called sea breams and porgies. The sheepshead, scup, and red seabream are species in this family. Most sparids are deep-bodied compressed fish with a small mouth separated by a broad space from the eye, a single dorsal fin with strong spines and soft rays, a short anal fin, long pointed pectoral fins and rather large firmly attached scales. They are found in shallow temperate and tropical waters and are bottom-dwelling carnivores.

There are hermaphrodites in the Sparidae. Protogyny and protandry appear sporadically through this lineage of fish. Simultaneous hermaphrodites and bi-directional hermaphrodites do not appear as much since Sparidae are found in shallower waters. Species of fish that express a hermaphroditic condition usually "lack a genetic hardwire", therefore ecological factors play a role in sex determination.

Most species possess grinding, molar-like teeth. Some of the species, such as Polysteganus undulosus, have been subject to overfishing, or exploitation beyond sustainable recovery.

Genera

The family Sparidae contains about 155 species in 38 genera:
 Acanthopagrus	Peters, 1855
 Amamiichthys Tanaka & Iwatsuki, 2015 
 Archosargus Gill, 1865
 Argyrops Swainson, 1839
 Argyrozona Smith, 1938 
 Boops	Cuvier, 1814
 Boopsoidea Castelnau, 1861 
 Calamus Swainson, 1839
 Centracanthus Rafinesque, 1810
 Cheimerius Smith, 1938
 Chrysoblephus Swainson, 1839
 Crenidens Valenciennes, 1830
 Cymatoceps Smith, 1938
 Dentex Cuvier, 1814
 Diplodus Rafinesque, 1810
 Evynnis Jordan & Thompson, 1912
 Gymnocrotaphus Günther, 1859
 Lagodon Holbrook, 1855
 Lithognathus Swainson, 1839
 Oblada Cuvier, 1829
 Pachymetopon Günther, 1859
 Pagellus Valenciennes, 1830
 Pagrus Cuvier, 1816
 Parargyrops Tanaka, 1916
 Petrus Smith, 1938  	
 Polyamblyodon Norman, 1935
 Polysteganus Klunzinger, 1870
 Porcostoma Smith, 1938
 Pterogymnus Smith, 1938
 Rhabdosargus Fowler, 1933
 Sarpa Bonaparte, 1831
 Sparidentex Munro, 1948
 Sparodon Smith, 1938
 Sparus Linnaeus, 1758
 Spicara Rafinesque, 1810
 Spondyliosoma Cantor, 1849
 Stenotomus Gill, 1865
 Virididentex Poll, 1971

Timeline of genera

Cookery

The most celebrated of the breams in cookery are the gilt-head bream and the common dentex.

See also
 Porgie fishing

References

 
Sport fish
Marine fish families
Articles which contain graphical timelines
Taxa named by Constantine Samuel Rafinesque